Ethiopid (also spelled Aethiopid, also called Erythriote, or Eastern Hamitic) is an outdated racial classification of humans indigenous to Northeastern Africa - the Horn of Africa and Nile Valley regions – who were typically classified as part of the Caucasian race – the Hamitic sub-branch, or in rare instances the Negroid race. The racial classification was generally made up of mostly Afro-Asiatic language speaking populations of the Horn of Africa (Semitic - Ethiosemitic, Cushitic, and Omotic speaking populations) but to an extent also includes several Nilo-Saharan language speaking populations of the Nile Valley and African Great Lakes region (including but not limited to Nilotic and Sudanic speaking populations).

According to John Baker (1974), in their stable form, their center of distribution was considered to be Horn of Africa, among that region's Hamito-Semitic-speaking populations. Baker described them as being of medium height, with a dolicocephalic or mesocephalic skull (see cephalic index), an essentially Caucasoid facial form, an orthognathic profile (no prognathism) and a rather prominent, narrow nose, often ringlety hair, and an invariably brown skin, with either a reddish or blackish tinge.

The concept of dividing humankind into three races called Caucasoid, Mongoloid, and Negroid (originally named "Ethiopian") was introduced in the 1780s by members of the Göttingen School of History and further developed by Western scholars in the context of racist ideologies during the age of colonialism.

With the rise of modern genetics, the concept of distinct human races in a biological sense has become obsolete. In 2019, the American Association of Biological Anthropologists stated: "Race does not provide an accurate representation of human biological variation. It was never accurate in the past, and it remains inaccurate when referencing contemporary human populations."

See also
Arabid race
Mediterranean race
Brown (racial classification)

References

Biological anthropology
Pseudoscience
Historical definitions of race